The following outline is provided as an overview of and topical guide to Somalia:

Somalia – country located in the Horn of Africa. It is bordered by Ethiopia to the west, Djibouti to the northwest, the Gulf of Aden to the north, the Guardafui Channel and Somali Sea to the east, and Kenya to the southwest. Somalia has the longest coastline on the mainland, and its terrain consists mainly of plateaus, plains and highlands. Hot conditions prevail year-round, along with periodic monsoon winds and irregular rainfall.

General reference 

 Pronunciation:  
 Common English country name:  Somalia
 Official English country name:  The Federal Republic of Somalia
 Common endonym(s):  
 Official endonym(s):  
 Adjectival(s): Somali
 Demonym(s): Somali; 
 ISO country codes:  SO, SOM, 706
 ISO region codes:  See ISO 3166-2:SO
 Internet country code top-level domain:  .so

Geography of Somalia 

 Somalia is: a country
 Location:
 Eastern Hemisphere, on the Equator
 Africa
 East Africa
 Horn of Africa
 Time zone:  East Africa Time (UTC+03)
 Extreme points of Somalia
 High:  Shimbiris 
 Low:  Indian Ocean 0 m
 Land boundaries:  2,340 km
 58 km
 1,600 km
 682 km
 Coastline:  3,025 km
 Population of Somalia: 8,699,000  - 90th most populous country

 Area of Somalia: 637,661 km2
 Atlas of Somalia

Environment of Somalia 

 Climate of Somalia
 Environmental issues in Somalia
 Ecoregions in Somalia
 Protected areas of Somalia
 National parks of Somalia
 Wildlife of Somalia
 Flora of Somalia
 Fauna of Somalia
 Birds of Somalia
 Mammals of Somalia

Natural geographic features of Somalia 

 Glaciers in Somalia: none 
 Rivers of Somalia

Regions of Somalia 

States and regions of Somalia

Ecoregions of Somalia 

List of ecoregions in Somalia
 Ecoregions in Somalia

Administrative divisions of Somalia 
Administrative divisions of Somalia
 Regions of Somalia
 Districts of Somalia
 Cities in Somalia

Regions 

Regions of Somalia
Bakool
Banaadir
Bari
Bay
Galguduud
Gedo
Hiiraan
Jubbada Dhexe
Jubbada Hoose
Mudug
Nugaal
Shabeellaha Dhexe
Shabeellaha Hoose

Claimed territory  

Awdal
Sanaag
Sool
Togdheer
Woqooyi Galbeed

Demography of Somalia 

Demographics of Somalia

Government and politics of Somalia 

Politics of Somalia
 Form of government:
 Capital of Somalia: Mogadishu
 History of the Transitional Federal Government of the Republic of Somalia
 History of Somalia (1991-2006)
 Elections in Somalia
 Political parties in Somalia

Branches of the government of Somalia 

Government of Somalia

Executive branch of the government of Somalia 
 Head of state: President of Somalia, Hassan Sheikh Mohamud
 Head of government: Prime Minister of Somalia, Omar Abdirashid Ali Sharmarke
 Cabinet of Somalia

Legislative branch of the government of Somalia 

 Parliament of Somalia: Federal Parliament (unicameral)

Judicial branch of the government of Somalia 

Judiciary of Somalia

Foreign relations of Somalia 

Foreign relations of Somalia
 Diplomatic missions in Somalia
 Diplomatic missions of Somalia

International organization membership 
The Republic of Somalia is a member of:

African, Caribbean, and Pacific Group of States (ACP)
African Development Bank Group (AfDB)
African Union (AU)
Arab Fund for Economic and Social Development (AFESD)
Arab Monetary Fund (AMF)
Council of Arab Economic Unity (CAEU)
Food and Agriculture Organization (FAO)
Group of 77 (G77)
Inter-Governmental Authority on Development (IGAD)
International Bank for Reconstruction and Development (IBRD)
International Civil Aviation Organization (ICAO)
International Criminal Police Organization (Interpol)
International Development Association (IDA)
International Federation of Red Cross and Red Crescent Societies (IFRCS)
International Finance Corporation (IFC)
International Fund for Agricultural Development (IFAD)
International Labour Organization (ILO)
International Maritime Organization (IMO)
International Monetary Fund (IMF)
International Olympic Committee (IOC)

International Organization for Migration (IOM)
International Red Cross and Red Crescent Movement (ICRM)
International Telecommunication Union (ITU)
International Telecommunications Satellite Organization (ITSO)
Inter-Parliamentary Union (IPU)
Islamic Development Bank (IDB)
League of Arab States (LAS)
Nonaligned Movement (NAM)
Organisation of Islamic Cooperation (OIC)
United Nations (UN)
United Nations Conference on Trade and Development (UNCTAD)
United Nations Educational, Scientific, and Cultural Organization (UNESCO)
United Nations High Commissioner for Refugees (UNHCR)
United Nations Industrial Development Organization (UNIDO)
Universal Postal Union (UPU)
World Federation of Trade Unions (WFTU)
World Health Organization (WHO)
World Intellectual Property Organization (WIPO)
World Meteorological Organization (WMO)

Somalia is one of only 7 U.N member countries, which are not a member state of the Organisation for the Prohibition of Chemical Weapons.

Law and order in Somalia 

Judiciary of Somalia
 Alcohol in Somalia
 Cannabis in Somalia
 Capital punishment in Somalia
 Constitution of Somalia
 Crime in Somalia
 Kidnapping and hostage taking in Somalia
 Piracy in Somalia
 Terrorism in Somalia
 Human rights in Somalia
 LGBT rights in Somalia
 Law enforcement in Somalia
 Marriage in Somalia
 Polygamy in Somalia
 Xeer

Military of Somalia 

Military of Somalia
 Command
 Commander-in-chief: Yusuf Osman Dumal
 Ministry of Defence of Somalia
 Forces
 Army of Somalia
 Navy of Somalia
 Air Force of Somalia
 Military history of Somalia

Local government in Somalia 

Local government in Somalia

History of Somalia 

History of Somalia
 Current events of Somalia
 Economic history of Somalia
 History of the Transitional Federal Government of the Republic of Somalia
 Maritime history of Somalia
 Military history of Somalia
 Somali Civil War
 Attempts at reconciliation in Somalia (1991–2004)
 Factions in the Somali Civil War
 Timeline of the War in Somalia
 2006 timeline of the War in Somalia
 2007 timeline of the War in Somalia
 2008 timeline of the War in Somalia
 2009 timeline of the Somali Civil War
 2010 timeline of the Somali Civil War
 2011 timeline of the Somali Civil War
 2012 timeline of the Somali Civil War
 2013 timeline of the Somali Civil War
 2014 timeline of the Somali Civil War
 2015 timeline of the Somali Civil War
 2016 timeline of the Somali Civil War
 2017 timeline of the Somali Civil War
 2018 timeline of the Somali Civil War
 Somalia War (2006–2009)
 Somali Civil War (2009–present)
 Political history of Somalia

Culture of Somalia 

Culture of Somalia
 Architecture of Somalia
 Cuisine of Somalia
 Languages of Somalia
 Media in Somalia
 National symbols of Somalia
 Coat of arms of Somalia
 Flag of Somalia
 National anthem of Somalia
 Public holidays in Somalia
 Religion in Somalia
 Islam in Somalia
 Christianity in Somalia
 Roman Catholicism in Somalia

Art in Somalia 
 Somali art
 Cinema of Somalia
 Somaliwood
 Literature of Somalia
 Music of Somalia

Sports in Somalia 

Sports in Somalia
 Somalia national football team
 Somalia national beach soccer team
 Somalia League
 Somalia Cup
 Somali Football Federation
 Somalia national basketball team
 Somalia at the Olympics

Economy and infrastructure of Somalia 

Economy of Somalia
 Economic rank, by nominal GDP (2007): 153rd (one hundred and fifty third)
 Agriculture in Somalia
 Banking in Somalia
 Central Bank of Somalia
 Communications in Somalia
 Internet in Somalia
 Companies of Somalia
Currency of Somalia: Shilling
ISO 4217: SOS
 Economic history of Somalia
 Energy in Somalia
 Health care in Somalia
 Mining in Somalia
 Somalia Stock Exchange
 Tourism in Somalia
 Transport in Somalia
 Airports in Somalia
 Rail transport in Somalia

Education in Somalia 

Education in Somalia
 National Library of Somalia
 Universities in Somalia

See also 

Somalia
Index of Somalia-related articles
List of international rankings
List of Somalia-related topics
Member state of the United Nations
Outline of Africa
Outline of geography

References

External links 

 Turbulent Waters in a Maritime Black Hole The Hague Centre for Strategic Studies May 2008
 Condemn US-Ethiopian aggression against Somalia Lalkar January 2007
Somalia Operations: Lessons Learned by Kenneth Allard (CCRP, 1995)
From Nation-State to Stateless Nation: The Somali Experience by Michael van Notten (Amsterdam, 2000)
"Preserving American Security Ties to Somalia," by Michael Johns, The Heritage Foundation, December 26, 1989.
Changed Arab attitudes to Somalia Conflict
"Separation Anxiety", article in The Walrus about post-traumatic stress disorder among Somali warriors
Between Kat and Katyushas Elaborated Article on the Contemporary History of Somalia

 Government
Official Website of the Federal Government of Somalia

 Geography
 Bissig Addo
 News;
Somalia - War situation since 1991 on France 24 – Special Report about Somalia on France 24 International News Channel
"Somalia in crisis" - collection of articles on the BBC
Somalia news headlines
Somalia's Struggle for Stability, Online NewsHour with Jim Lehrer
HRW claims US involved in secret detention of Somalis, Breaking Legal News 2007/04/01
IRIN Somalia humanitarian news and analysis
U.S. Special Envoy Cites Widespread ‘Lack of Confidence’ in Somali Government Council on Foreign Relations
ITN/CNN Report "War tears Somalia apart", an up-to-date report on Mogadishu, October 10, 2007.

 Economy
Anarchy and Invention: How Does Somalia's Private Sector Cope without Government?
Breaking Legal News 2007/04/01

 General information

CBC Digital Archives - The Somalia Affair
News and Discussions

 Religion
Mustaqbalka Ummadda Somaaliyeed

 1
Somalia